Sámara is a district of the Nicoya canton, in the Guanacaste province of Costa Rica.

History 
Sámara was created on 26 November 1971 by Decreto Ejecutivo 2075-G. Segregated from Nicoya.

Geography 
Sámara has an area of  km2 and an elevation of  metres.

Demographics 

For the 2011 census, Sámara had a population of  inhabitants.

Villages
Administrative center of the district is the town of Sámara.

Other villages in the district are Bajo Escondido, Barco Quebrado, Buenavista, Buenos Aires, Cambutes, Cangrejal, Cantarrana, Chinampas, Esterones, Galilea, Palmar, Panamá, Playa Buena Vista, Primavera, Pueblo Nuevo, Samaria, Santo Domingo, Taranta, Terciopelo and Torito.

Economy

Tourism
This region was popular long before the arrival of foreign tourists by locals in the immediate area for weekend enjoyment, and by "weekenders" and summer-home owners from the capital of San Jose. The quality of the beaches in Sámara and neighboring Carrillo made the area a high priority region of tourism industry development for the Costa Rican government shortly after the opening of Liberia's Daniel Oduber International Airport. Because the beach is accessible from three of Costa Rica's four international airports, influential business owners and well connected landowners were able to secure government-funded improvements to the highway and beach infrastructure earlier than competing tourism regions like Nosara and Guiones, providing easy access to the virtually pristine beaches and calm ocean waters. These calm waters makes Sámara a well-known spot for surf beginners.

Transportation

Road transportation 
The district is covered by the following road routes:
 National Route 150
 National Route 160
 National Route 934

Sámara is located approximately 35 km from Nicoya, the economic and administrative hub of the region.

Access to Sámara is via paved roads. The paving of the final 35 km of the drive, Route 150 from Nicoya to Sámara on through to Carrillo was completed in early 2006. Public buses operate between Sámara and Nicoya; express buses operated by Empresa Alfaro connect Sámara with San Jose.

Air service is provided by Sansa Airlines to the small Carrillo Airport, about 5 km east of Sámara.

References 

Districts of Guanacaste Province
Populated places in Guanacaste Province